Noble Lady Shun (3 January 1748 – 1790), of the Manchu Niohuru clan, was a consort of the Qianlong Emperor of the Qing dynasty.

Life

Family background
Noble Lady Shun was born in the Manchu Niohuru clan. Her personal name is unknown. Her father was Aibida (愛必達), a governor (總督) and grandson of Ebilun. Her great-aunt was Empress Xiaozhaoren, the second empress of the Kangxi Emperor. Lady Niohuru's ancestry and family was filled with prestigious officials and respectable individuals.

Qianlong era
Lady Niohuru was born on 3 January 1748 during the reign of the Qianlong Emperor. She entered the Forbidden City in 1766 and was granted the rank of "Noble Lady Chang" (常貴人). Originally, Empress Dowager Chongqing suggested that she be selected as empress, as the previous empress had died that same year and the only one leading the imperial harem was Imperial Noble Consort Ling, a Han woman who could never legally marry the emperor. Qianlong rejected Lady Niohuru, stating that he would never promote anyone to the position of empress again, and continued to leave palace affairs to the Imperial Noble Consort.

In 1768 Lady Niohuru was promoted to "Imperial Concubine Shun" (順嬪). In 1771, the Emperor took a southern tour of the country, bringing only six consorts with him. Among them was Lady Niohuru. In 1776 she became pregnant, but suffered a miscarriage. That same year, the emperor elevated her to the status of "Consort Shun" (順妃), perhaps to comfort her. A similar occurrence happened to Consort Yu in 1759. The promotion ceremony was set to be held in the following year but was delayed by two years because of the death of the empress dowager in 1777. 

In 1780 Consort Shun lead the Silkworm Worship Ceremony, which was usually held by the empress herself.

The Qianlong Emperor was said to have a great relationship with Consort Shun. There is a record that the emperor personally hunted two ducks and gave them to her as a gift. She was one of the twelve consorts out of Qianlong's fifty to be drawn in the painting "Portraits of the Qianlong Emperor and His Twelve Consorts" by Giuseppe Castiglione.

In 1788 Lady Niohuru was demoted to "Imperial Concubine Shun" (順嬪) for unknown reasons. 16 days later she was demoted to "Noble Lady Shun" (順貴人).

She died in 1790 at the age of forty-one or forty-two and was interred in the Yuling Mausoleum for imperial consorts in the Eastern Qing Tombs.

Titles
 During the reign of the Qianlong Emperor (r. 1735–1796):
 Lady Niohuru (鈕祜祿氏; from 1748)
 Noble Lady Chang (from 1766), sixth rank consort
 Imperial Concubine Shun (from 1768), fifth rank consort
 Consort Shun (from 1776), fourth rank consort
 Imperial Concubine Shun (順嬪; from 1788), fifth rank consort
 Noble Lady Shun (from 1788), sixth rank consort

In popular culture
Portrayed by Jenny Zhang in 2018 Chinese TV series Story of Yanxi Palace.

See also
 Imperial Chinese harem system#Qing
 Royal and noble ranks of the Qing dynasty

References

Consorts of the Qianlong Emperor
1748 births
1788 deaths
Manchu people